"This Gift" is the first single released by American boy band 98 Degrees from their third studio album, This Christmas. It was written by Anders Bagge, Arnthor Birgisson, Dane Deviller, and Sean Hosein and released during Christmastime of 1999. The single peaked at number 49 in the US Billboard Hot 100 and number 14 on the Billboard Hot Adult Contemporary Tracks chart.

Charts

Bro'Sis version 

In 2002, German pop group Bro'Sis re-recorded the song for the Special Winter Edition reissue of their debut studio album Never Forget (Where You Come From) (2002). Re-titled "The Gift" and released as reissue's second single, it entered the top twenty of the German Singles Chart.

Formats and track listings

Credits and personnel 
 Ross Antony – vocals
 Hila Bronstein – vocals
 Nik Hafeman – vocal arrangements, executive producer
 Shaham Joyce – vocals
 Dirk Kurock – vocals recording
 Faiz Mangat – vocals
 Peter Ries – production, mixing
 Ossi Schaller – guitars
 Indira Weis – vocals
 Giovanni Zarrella – vocals

Charts

References 

1999 singles
98 Degrees songs
American Christmas songs
Bro'Sis songs
Universal Music Group singles
Universal Motown Records singles
Motown singles
1999 songs
Songs written by Anders Bagge
Songs written by Arnthor Birgisson
Songs written by Dane Deviller
Songs written by Sean Hosein